Lechaim (Лехаим) is the flagship magazine of the Federation of Jewish Communities of the CIS (FJC).

History and profile
Lechaim was founded in 1991. It is printed monthly in Russian, with sections on news, memoirs, Torah studies, Jewish culture and art, literature and interviews. Most of the content is also available online.

References

External links
Official website 
FJC page

1991 establishments in Russia
Jewish magazines
Magazines established in 1991
Magazines published in Moscow
Religious magazines
Russian-language magazines
Monthly magazines published in Russia
News magazines published in Russia